The Member System, modeled on the cabinet system, was created by British authorities in Malaysia to provide self-governance. Like the Communities Liaison Committee, it drew on members of different communities, and was later described as setting a precedent for the powersharing multiracial Malayan and Malaysian cabinets post-independence.

At 1951, Sir Henry Gurney, the British High Commissioner in Malaya announced the members, their duty started at April 1951 until June 1955, before the election.

3 portfolios still holding by British, they are Housing and Public Works by J. D. Mead, Industry and Social Relations, and Economic Affairs.

References

Political history of Malaysia